I.D. is an album by The Wailers Band, released in 1989.

Track listing
 "Solution" (Junior Marvin, Aston Barrett)
 "Children of the World" (Junior Marvin)
 "Reggae Love" (Junior Marvin)
 "Irie" (Junior Marvin, Aston Barrett)
 "Love is Forever" (Junior Marvin)
 "Chasing Tomorrow" (Al Anderson)
 "Rice and Peas" (Junior Marvin)
 "Love One Another" (Junior Marvin)
 "Life Goes On" (Junior Marvin, Irving "Carrott" Jarrett)
 "Have Faith in Jah" (Junior Marvin)
 "One One Coco" (Junior Marvin, Michaux, Smith)
 "P's and Q's" (Junior Marvin, Aston Barrett)

Personnel
Aston "Family Man" Barrett: bass, acoustic piano, rhythm guitar, percussion and synthesizer
Junior Marvin: lead vocals, backing vocals, guitar and synthesizer
Earl "Wya" Lindo: Hammond B3 organ, synthesizer, backing vocals
Al Anderson: guitars, vocals,
Irvin "Carrot" Jarrett: percussion
Martin Batista: keyboards 
Michael "Boo" Richards: drums and percussion
Ed Michaux, Desi Smith, Pam Hall, and Erica Newell: backing vocals
Carlton "Carly" Barrett: Drums

References

1989 albums
The Wailers Band albums
Atlantic Records albums